Marta Carro Nolasco (born 6 January 1991) is a Spanish professional footballer who plays as a midfielder for Liga F club Valencia CF and the Spain women's national team. She previously played in AGSM Verona in Italy's women's Serie A. and Atlético Madrid.

Honours

Clubs
Atlético Madrid
Copa de la Reina de Fútbol: Winner, 2016

International
Spain
 Cyprus Cup: Winner, 2018

References

External links
 
Profile at Txapeldunak.com 

1991 births
Living people
Spanish women's footballers
Expatriate women's footballers in Italy
Primera División (women) players
Serie A (women's football) players
Atlético Madrid Femenino players
A.S.D. AGSM Verona F.C. players
Valencia CF Femenino players
Women's association football central defenders
Women's association football midfielders
Spain women's international footballers
21st-century Spanish women